Relaxing at Sea: Live on the QE2 is a live album by jazz saxophonist Lou Donaldson recorded on the Queen Elizabeth 2 ocean liner and released on the Chiaroscuro label featuring Donaldson with Lonnie Smith, Randy Johnston, and Danny Burger with Nicholas Payton added on trumpet on two tracks.

The album was awarded 4 stars in an Allmusic review by Alex Henderson who states "Donaldson continued to command a loyal following when he entered his 70s; the improviser had just turned 73 when Relaxing at Sea was recorded... it was obvious that he could still play the heck out of his alto... Although it falls short of essential, Relaxing at Sea Live on the QE2 is a solid, pleasing addition to Donaldson's huge catalog".

Track listing
All compositions by Lou Donaldson except as indicated
 "Harlem Nocturne" (Earle Hagen, Dick Rogers) - 7:57
 "Marmaduke" (Charlie Parker) - 8:07
 "Whiskey Drinkin' Woman" - 12:34
 "Midnight Creeper" - 6:27
 "Fast and Freaky" - 5:26
 "It Was a Dream" (Big Bill Broonzy) - 7:03
 "Confirmation" (Parker) - 8:02
 "Now's the Time" (Parker) - 10:32
 "I Can't Get Started" (Vernon Duke, Ira Gershwin) - 7:32
 "Lou's New York Theme Song" - 0:34
 Jazzspeak - 5:38
Recorded aboard the QE2 on November 5, 6, 8 & 10, 1999.

Personnel
Lou Donaldson - alto saxophone, vocals
Nicholas Payton - trumpet (tracks 8 & 9)
Lonnie Smith - organ
Randy Johnston - guitar
Danny Burger - drums

References

Lou Donaldson live albums
2000 live albums
Chiaroscuro Records live albums